is a Japanese politician of the Liberal Democratic Party, a member of the House of Representatives in the Diet (national legislature). A native of Setagaya, Tokyo and graduate of Keio University, he worked at Sanwa Bank, (now part of The Bank of Tokyo-Mitsubishi UFJ) from 1996 to 2003. He was elected to the House of Representatives for the first time in 2005 after an unsuccessful run in 2003.

Right-wing positions
He was a supporter of right-wing filmmaker Satoru Mizushima's 2007 revisionist film The Truth about Nanjing, which denied that the Nanking Massacre ever occurred.

References

External links 
  in Japanese.

1973 births
Living people
People from Setagaya
Keio University alumni
Koizumi Children
Members of the House of Representatives (Japan)
Liberal Democratic Party (Japan) politicians
Nanjing Massacre deniers